Craig Smith (born 31 October 1971) is a New Zealand former professional rugby league footballer who played as a  in the 1990s and 2000s. He played for the South Sydney Rabbitohs, Illawarra Steelers, St. George Illawarra Dragons and the Newcastle Knights as well as representing New Zealand, New Zealand Māori and Queensland.

Background
Smith was born in Kaitaia, New Zealand and originally was a rugby union player in Northland. In 1988, Smith moved to Queensland to complete his final years of schooling at Ipswich Grammar School. He later took up rugby league.

Playing career

Club career

South Sydney Rabbitohs
Smith commenced his top level career with the South Sydney Rabbitohs in the 1995 ARL season.

Illawarra Steelers
He then moved to the Illawarra Steelers.

St. George Illawarra Dragons
Smith played at prop forward for the St. George Illawarra Dragons in their 1999 NRL Grand Final loss to the Melbourne Storm.

Wigan Warriors
Following a series of suspensions in 2001 for contrary conduct and striking, Smith left the NRL and Australia in 2002 to play for the Super League club, the Wigan Warriors. With Wigan, he won the 2002 Challenge Cup Final.

Newcastle Knights
In 2005, Smith agreed to a one-year deal and a return to the NRL with the Newcastle Knights.

Although originally intending to retire at the end of the 2005 season, Smith was re-signed by Newcastle for the 2006 season. A broken jaw in August 2006 sidelined him for several rounds but he was fit to return for Newcastle's finals appearances. Smith played his last NRL game in Newcastle's semi-finals defeat by the Brisbane Broncos.

Representative career

Queensland
Smith was selected to represent Queensland as a prop for games I and II of the 1997 State of Origin series and on the bench for game III.

New Zealand
Smith was selected to go on the 1998 New Zealand tour of Great Britain and played for the Kiwis twelve times between 1998 and 2001.

Smith was selected for the New Zealand team to compete in the end of season 1999 Rugby League Tri-Nations tournament. In the final against Australia he played at prop forward in the Kiwis' 20-22 loss.

New Zealand Maori
Smith was again coaxed out of retirement to take part in the New Zealand Māori team that met the Indigenous Dreamtime team in a commemorative match at the 2008 Rugby League World Cup.

Coaching career
Smith has been on the coaching staff for the under-20s side at Newcastle.

References

Footnotes

External links

NRL profile
Craig Smith at NRL Stats

1971 births
Living people
New Zealand rugby league coaches
New Zealand rugby league players
New Zealand expatriate sportspeople in England
New Zealand expatriate sportspeople in Australia
New Zealand Māori rugby league players
New Zealand Māori rugby league team players
New Zealand national rugby league team players
South Sydney Rabbitohs players
Illawarra Steelers players
St. George Illawarra Dragons players
Newcastle Knights players
Newcastle Knights captains
Queensland Rugby League State of Origin players
Rugby league players from Northland Region
Rugby league props
New Zealand emigrants to Australia
Wigan Warriors players